Dunklee is a surname. Notable people with the surname include:

Ernest W. Dunklee (1890–1974), American farmer and politician
Everett Dunklee (born 1946), American cross-country skier
Stan Dunklee (born 1954), American cross-country skier
Susan Dunklee (born 1986), American biathlete